Hannibal Sehested may refer to:

Hannibal Sehested (governor) (1609–1666), Danish statesman and Governor of Norway
Hannibal Sehested (council president) (1842–1924), Danish Council President